The 2019 Morgan State Bears football team represented Morgan State University in the 2019 NCAA Division I FCS football season. They were led by first-year head coach Tyrone Wheatley. The Bears played their home games at Hughes Stadium and were a member of the Mid-Eastern Athletic Conference (MEAC). They finished the season 3–9, 2–6 in MEAC play to finish in a tie for seventh place.

Previous season
The Bears finished the 2018 season 4–7, 3–4 in MEAC play to finish in a tie for sixth place.

On November 22, 2018 MSU Athletic Director Edward Scott announced that the search for a full-time head coach would begin, with interim head coach Ernest T. Jones being a candidate for the position. Ultimately, Tyrone Wheatley was announced as the new head coach on February 7, 2019. Jones decided to move on from the MSU staff, finishing his interim head coaching tenure with a record of 4–7.

Preseason

MEAC preseason poll
In a vote of the MEAC head coaches and sports information directors, released at the conference's media day on July 26, the Bears were picked to finish in eight place and received one first place vote.

Preseason All-MEAC Team
The Bears had ten players selected to the preseason all-MEAC teams.

Offense

1st team

Xavier Gravette – TE

2nd team

Stefan Touani – OL

3rd team

Josh Chase – RB

Bruce Trigg – OL

Defense

1st team

Rico Kennedy – LB

2nd team

Ian McBorrough – LB

Donte Small – DB

3rd team

Devan Hebron – DL

Dominick Trigg – DB

Specialists

3rd team

Nicholas O'Shea – PK

Schedule

Source:

Game summaries

at Bowling Green

at James Madison

at Army

North Carolina Central

at Bethune−Cookman

Delaware State

at South Carolina State

Florida A&M

at Norfolk State

North Carolina A&T

Virginia University of Lynchburg

at Howard

Coaching staff

References

Morgan State
Morgan State Bears football seasons
Morgan State Bears football